The Belknap Mountains are a small mountain range in the Lakes Region of New Hampshire in the United States. The range lies in the towns of Gilford, Gilmanton, and Alton in Belknap County. Belknap Mountain State Forest covers the central part of the range, including the summit and slopes of Belknap Mountain.

The named summits in the range, from northwest to southeast, are Mount Rowe, Gunstock Mountain, Belknap Mountain, Straightback Mountain, and Mount Major. A secondary ridge extends southwest from Belknap Mountain to the Gilford/Gilmanton line, containing, from north to south, the summits of Piper Mountain and Whiteface Mountain.

The range is entirely in the Merrimack River watershed. The northeast side of the range drains via several small brooks to Lake Winnipesaukee, the outlet of which is the Winnipesaukee River, which drains westward to form the Merrimack. The west side of the range drains via the Gunstock River into Lake Winnipesaukee, and the extreme southwest end of the range, near Whiteface Mountain, drains west via the Tioga River to the Winnipesaukee River. The south side of the range, including Round Pond, drains south via the Suncook River to the Merrimack. 

Mount Rowe and Gunstock Mountain form the slopes of Gunstock Mountain Resort, a major ski area for central New Hampshire.

References

External links
 Belknap Range Trails (hiking map)
 Belknap Range Conservation Lands (land ownership map and data)

Landforms of Belknap County, New Hampshire
Mountain ranges of New Hampshire